Mariana Alexandra Espinosa Chicaiza (born 13 November 1984) is an Ecuadorian former footballer who played as a midfielder and a left back. She has been a member of the Ecuador women's national team.

International career
Espinosa capped for Ecuador at senior level during three Copa América Femenina editions (2003, 2006 and 2010).

References

External links

1984 births
Living people
Footballers from Quito
Women's association football midfielders
Women's association football fullbacks
Ecuadorian women's footballers
Ecuador women's international footballers
21st-century Ecuadorian women